Howard is a rural town and locality in the Fraser Coast Region, Queensland, Australia. It is a southern boundary of the Dundaburra peoples of the Northern Kabi Kabi Isis districts and surrounds.

Geography
The Bruce Highway passes through the locality in an east–west direction skirting the edge of the town. Queensland's North Coast railway line passes in a NW-SE direction through the town centre with Howard railway station serving the town. The main streets of Howard are Steley and William.

History
The town was originally known as Steley (after Abel Steley) but was renamed after William Howard, a pioneer in coal mining in the Burrum area.

Abel Steley commenced coal mining in the area in 1856. After a series of setbacks, he eventually established the successful Beauford Colliery and the Queensland Collieries Company.

In 1877 George Howard and his son William established the Howard Colliery.

The first Burrum Post Office opened on 22 July 1878 and was renamed Howard in 1883.

Burrum Provisional School opened on 18 February 1879. On 3 October 1884, it was renamed Howard State School.

St Matthew's Anglican Church was opened on 3 October 1883 by Bishop Matthew Hale. A new church was dedicated on 29 October 1913 by Archbishop St Clair Donaldson and the old church became the church hall. During World War II the hall was used as a field hospital. Its closure circa 2017 was approved by Bishop Jeremy Greaves. The church and hall are at 11 William Street on the south-west corner with Diamantina Drive.

On Sunday 30 March 1884 a Primitive Methodist Church was opened in Howard. With the amalgamation of the various Methodist denominations c 1900, it became the Howard Methodist Church and with the amalgamation of the Methodist Church into the Uniting Church in Australia in 1977, it became the Howard Uniting Church.

Howard was the seat of the Howard Division (1900-1903) and its successor Shire of Howard (1903-1917).

The Howard War Memorial was unveiled by Colin Rankin on 17 December 1921. Unusually for an Australian war memorial, the statue was made in Italy and depicts a soldier in Italian uniform.

In May 1984, the Bruce Highway bypass was opened. Previously the highway had run through the town on Robertson Street. Neighbouring Torbanlea was also bypassed as part of same project.

The Howard Library opened in 2000 and underwent a major refurbishment in 2014.

The historic wooden foot bridge over the railway line in Steley Street near the C.W.A Hall was demolished in 2016 as it became too expensive to maintain. It was a popular spot for photographing trains traveling north or south.

Heritage listings 
Howard has a number of heritage-listed sites, including:
 William Street: Howard War Memorial
 23 William Street: Brooklyn House

Education 
Howard State School is a government primary (Prep-6) school for boys and girls at 108 William Street. In 2012 the school had an enrolment of 177 students with 12 teachers (11.3 full-time equivalent). In 2018, the school had an enrolment of 108 students with 8 teachers (7 full-time equivalent) and 8 non-teaching staff (5 full-time equivalent).

There is no secondary school in Howard; the nearest are in Childers to the north-west, Hervey Bay to the east and Maryborough to the south.

Amenities 
Steley Street contains the skatepark, railway station, children's playground, community centre, kindergarten, respite centre, located on the southern end. Over the railway line is the Howard Sawmill (producers of kiln dried Queensland hardwood). The post office, drapery and patchwork store, hairdresser, grocery and hardware store are on the northern end.  A 48-hour stop over for RVs is located in Steley Street opposite the Community Centre. The Howard Sub Branch of the RSL is located in Steley Street opposite the RV stop over.

The Fraser Coast Regional Council operates a public library at 56 Steley Street.

The Howard branch of the Queensland Country Women's Association meets at the CWA hall at 77 Steley Street.

William Street consists of a milk bar, butcher, bakery, pharmacy, hotel, bottle shop, newsagency, IGA supermarket, chip shop, doctor and several real estate agents.

Howard/Torbanlea Uniting Church is in Coal Street. It is part of the Mary Burnett Presbytery of the Uniting Church in Australia.

Howard also has a golf course on the outer part of the main part of town.

The Bowls Club is located at Torbanlea.

Events 
The Howard Country Market is held on the first Saturday of every month except January at the community centre.  This market is the largest on the Fraser Coast with well over 100 stalls selling a huge variety of goods.

Notable residents
 Andrew Fisher, first Federal Member for the electorate of Wide Bay and second Labor Prime Minister of Australia. The house he built and lived in still stands.
 Annabelle Rankin, the first woman from Queensland to sit in the Parliament of Australia, the first woman to have a federal portfolio and the first woman to be appointed head of a foreign mission. She lived in Brooklyn House.
 Colin Rankin, chairman of the Shire of Howard, member for Burrum in the Queensland Legislative Assembly. He lived in Brooklyn House.
Eric Harris (rugby league), Rugby league player who played for Toowoomba, Wests Brisbane, Queensland and Leeds in England.

Notes and references

External links

 
 
 Burrum River and Howard community website

 
Towns in Queensland
Wide Bay–Burnett
Fraser Coast Region
Localities in Queensland